Millions is an American noise rock band from Chicago.

Formed in late 2006, they played their first shows and released their first EP in 2007.  The EP, Telephone Game, was released on Team Abunai records.

In 2008, they recorded their first full length, Gather Scatter.  It was released on Seventh Rule Recordings in 2009. Following a European tour, the band released a 4 song EP on Brutal Panda Records entitled Panic Program.

In 2012, they announced a second full length, Failure Tactics, to be released on Seventh Rule Recordings.

Millions features former members of Small Brown Bike, Bodyhammer, and New Jersey Joystick. They are perhaps best known for their signature count-off at the beginning of most songs: "One, two, you know what to do...," as can be heard on their first full-length LP.

Discography

Albums
 Gather Scatter - 2009 on Seventh Rule Recordings
 Failure Tactics - 2012 on Seventh Rule Recordings

EPs
 Telephone Game 7-inch EP - 2007 on Team Abunai
 Saddle Up and Ride EP - 2008 on Team Abunai
 Panic Program 7-inch EP - 2010 on Brutal Panda

References

External links 
 Official Site
 Myspace Site
 Official Blog
 [ Gather Scatter review at Allmusic]
 Millions feature in New City
 Millions feature in Decibel Magazine
 Gather Scatter review at Lambgoat
 Gather Scatter review at Adequacy.net
 Gather Scatter review in Revolver Magazine

American art rock groups
Musical groups established in 2007
Musical groups from Chicago
American noise rock music groups